Events in the year 1699 in Norway.

Incumbents
Monarch: Christian V (until 25 August); then Frederick IV

Events
30 September - Frederik Gabel is appointed Vice Steward of Norway.
The waterfall Steinsdalsfossen was formed when the river found a new race.

Arts and literature

Painting of the family of farmer Bjørn Frøysåk is made.

Births

Deaths
 12 March – Peder Griffenfeld, statesman (b. 1635)
 13 April – Hans Rosing, bishop (b.1625).
25 August – Christian V (b. 1646)

Full date of death missing 
Christian Jørgensen Kruse, government official (b. 1636)

See also

References